Inspector Gadget: Advance Mission is a video game based on the television show of the same name.

Reception

References

External links
Inspector Gadget: Advance Mission at UK GameSpot

Video games based on Inspector Gadget
2001 video games
Game Boy Advance games
Game Boy Advance-only games
Video games about police officers
Video games developed in France
DreamCatcher Interactive games
Single-player video games
Action video games